Protomyctophum tenisoni is a species of lanternfish.

References

Lampanyctus
Taxa named by John Roxborough Norman
Fish described in 1930